Fractional approval voting is an electoral system using approval ballots (each voter selects one or more candidate alternatives), in which the outcome is fractional: for each alternative j there is a fraction pj between 0 and 1, such that the sum of pj is 1. It can be seen as a generalization of approval voting: in the latter, one candidate wins (pj = 1) and the other candidates lose (pj = 0). The fractions pj can be interpreted in various ways, depending on the setting. Examples are:

 Time sharing: each alternative j is implemented a fraction pj of the time (e.g. each candidate j serves in office a fraction pj of the term).
 Budget distribution: each alternative j receives a fraction pj of the total budget.
 Probabilities: after the fractional results are computed, there is a lottery for selecting a single candidate, where each candidate j is elected with probability pj.
 Entitlements: the fractional results are used as entitlements (also called weights) in rules of apportionment, or in algorithms of fair division with different entitlements.

Fractional approval voting is a special case of fractional social choice in which all voters have dichotomous preferences. It appears in the literature under many different terms: lottery, sharing, portioning, mixing and distribution.

Formal definitions 
There is a finite set C of candidates (also called: outcomes or alternatives), and a finite set N of n voters (also called: agents). Each voter i specifies a subset Ai of C, which represents the set of candidates that the voter approves.

A fractional approval voting rule takes as input the set of sets Ai, and returns as output a mixture (also called: distribution or lottery) - a vector p of real numbers in [0,1], one number for each candidate, such that the sum of numbers is 1.

It is assumed that each agent i gains a utility of 1 from each candidate in his approval set Ai, and a utility of 0 from each candidate not in Ai. For example, if the mixture p is interpreted as a budget distribution, then the utility of i is the total budget allocated to outcomes he likes.

Desired properties

Basic properties 
Two basic properties of voting rules in general, and fractional-approval-voting rules in particular, are:

Anonymity - the names of the voters do not matter;
Neutrality - the names of the candidates do not matter;

Efficiency properties 
Pareto-efficiency (PE) means no mixture gives a higher utility to one agent and at least as high utility to all others.

Ex-post PE is a weaker property, relevant only for the interpretation of a mixture as a lottery. It means that, after the lottery, no outcome gives a higher utility to one agent and at least as high utility to all others (in other words, it is a mixture over PE outcomes). For example, suppose there are 5 candidates (a,b,c,d,e) and 6 voters with approval sets (ac, ad, ae, bc, bd, be). Selecting any single candidate is PE, so every lottery is ex-post PE. But the lottery selecting c,d,e with probability 1/3 each is not PE, since it gives an expected utility of 1/3 to each voter, while the lottery selecting a,b with probability 1/2 each gives an expected utility of 1/2 to each voter.

PE always implies ex-post PE.  The opposite is also true in the following cases:

 When there are at most 4 voters, or at most 3 candidates.
 When the candidates can be ordered on a line such that each approval set is an interval (analogously to single peaked preferences).

Fairness properties 
Fairness requirements are captured by variants of the notion of fair share (FS).

Individual-FS (also called Fair Welfare Share) means that the utility of each voter i is at least 1/n, that is, at least 1/n of the budget is allocated to candidates approved by i.

Individual-Outcome-FS means that the utility of each voter i is at least his utility in a lottery that selects a candidate randomly, that is, at least k/|C|, where k is the number of candidates approved by i.

 Individual-FS and individual-outcome-FS are insufficient since they ignore groups of voters. For example, if 99% of the voters approve X and 1% approve Y, then both properties allow to give 1/2 of the budget to X and 1/2 to Y. This is arguably unfair for the group of Y supporters.

Single-vote-FS (also called faithful) means that, if each voter approves a single candidate, then the fraction assigned to each candidate j equals the number of voters who approve j divided by n.

 Single-vote-FS is a basic requirement, but it is insufficient since it does not say anything about the case in which voters may approve two or more candidates.

Unanimous-FS means that, for each set S of voters with identical preferences, the utility of each member in S is at least |S|/n.

 Unanimous-FS implies single-vote-FS, but it is still insufficient since it does not say anything about groups of agents whose approval-sets overlap.

Group-FS (also callde proportional sharing) means that, for each voter set S, the total budget allocated to candidates approved by at least one member of S, is at least |S|/n.

 Group-FS implies unanimous-FS, single-vote-FS and individual-FS.
Group-FS is equivalent to a property called decomposability: it is possible to decompose the distribution to n distributions of sum 1/n, such that the distribution recommended to agent i is positive only on candidates approved by i.
Average-FS means that, for each voter set S with at least one approved candidate in common, the average utility of voters in S is at least |S|/n.

Core-FS means that, for each voter set S, there is no other distribution of their |S|/n budget, which gives all members of S a higher utility.

 Core-FS implies Group-FS.

Strategic properties 
Several variants of strategyproofness (SP) have been studied for voting rules:

 Individual-SP means that an individual voter, who reports insincere preferences, cannot get a higher utility.
 Weak-group-SP means that a group of voters, who report insincere preferences in coordination, cannot get a higher utility for all of them.
 Group-SP means that a group of voters, who report insincere preferences in coordination, cannot get a higher utility for at least one of them, and at least as high utility for all of them.
Preference-monotonicity means that if a voter, who previously did not support a certain candidate X, starts supporting X, then the shares of the other candidates do not increase. This implies individual-SP.
A weaker variant of SP is excludable SP. It is relevant in situations where it is possible to exclude voters from using some candidate alternatives. For example, if the candidates are meeting times, then it is possible to exclude voters from participating in the meeting in times which they did not approve. This makes it harder to manipulate, and therefore, the requirement is weaker.

Participation properties 
Rules should encourage voters to participate in the voting process. Several participation criteria have been studied:

 Weak participation: the utility of a voter when he participates is at least as high as his utility when he does not participate (this is the negation of the no show paradox). 
Strict participation: the utility of a voter when he participates is strictly higher than his utility when he does not participate. Particularly, a voter gains from participating even if he has "clones" - voters with identical preferences.
A stronger property is required in participatory budgeting settings in which the budget to distribute is donated by the voters themselves:

 Pooling participation: the utility of a voter when he donates through the mechanism is at least as high as his utility when he donates on his own.

Rules

Utilitarian rule 
The utilitarian rule aims to maximize the sum of utilities, and therefore it distributes the entire budget among the candidates approved by the largest number of voters. In particular, if there is one candidate with the largest number of votes, then this candidate gets 1 (that is, all the budget) and the others get 0, as in single-winner approval voting. If there are some k candidates with the same largest number of votes, then the budget is distributed equally among them, giving 1/k to each such candidate and 0 to all others. The utilitarian rule has several desirable properties: it is anonymous, neutral, PE, individual-SP, and preference-monotone. It is also easy to compute.

However, it is not fair towards minorities - it violates Individual-FS (as well as all stronger variants of FS). For example, if 51% of the voters approve X and 49% of the voters approve Y, then the utilitarian rule gives all the budget to X and no budget at all to Y, so the 49% who vote for Y get a utility of 0. In other words, it allows for tyranny of the majority.

The utilitarian rule is also not weak-group-SP (and hence not group-SP). For example, suppose there are 3 candidates (a,b,c) and 3 voters, each of them approves a single candidate. If they vote sincerely, then the utilitarian mixture is (1/3,1/3,1/3) so each agent's utility is 1/3. If a single voter votes insincerely (say, the first one votes for both a and b), then the mixture is (0,1,0), which is worse for the insincere voter. However, if two voters collude and vote insincerely (say, the first two voters vote for the first two outcomes), then the utilitarian mixture is (1/2, 1/2, 0), which is better for both insincere voters.

Nash-optimal rule 
The Nash-optimal rule maximizes the sum of logarithms of utilities. It is anonymous and neutral, and satisfies the following additional properties:

 PE;
 Group-FS (decomposability), Average-FS, Core-FS;
Pooling participation (and strict participation);
 No other strategyproofness property (fails even excludable-SP);

The Nash-optimal rule can be computed by solving a convex program. There is another rule, called fair utilitarian, which satisfies similar properties (PE and group-FS) but is easier to compute.

Egalitarian rule 
The egalitarian (leximin) rule maximizes the smallest utility, then the next-smallest, etc. It is anonymous and neutral, and satisfies the following additional properties:

 PE;
 Individual-FS, but not unanimous-FS;
 Excludable-individual-SP, but not individual-SP;
Weak-participation, but not strict-participation (since "clones" - voters with identical preferences - are treated as a single voter).

Other welfarist rules 
For any monotonically-increasing function f, one can maximize the sum of f(ui). The utilitarian rule is a special case where f(x)=x, and the Nash rule is a special case where f(x)=log(x). Every f-maximizing rule is PE, and has the following additional properties:

 If f is any concave function of log, then it guarantees Individual-FS. 
 If-and-only-if f is the log function itself, then it guarantees group-FS and unanimous-FS (this corresponds to the Nash-optimal rule).
 If-and-only-if f is a linear function, then it is individual-SP (this corresponds to the utilitarian rule). 
If-and-only-if it is the utilitarian or the egalitarian rule, it satisfies excludable-SP; 
If-and-only-if it is NOT the utilitarian nor the egalitarian rule, it satisfies strict-participation.

Priority rules 
A priority rule (also called serial dictatorhip) is parametrized by a permutation of the voters, representing a priority ordering. It selects an outcome that maximizes the utility of the highest-priority agent; subject to that, maximizes the utility of the second-highest-priorty agent; and so on. Every priority rule is neutral, PE, weak-group-SP, and preference-monotone. However, it is not anonymous and does not satisfy any fairness notion.

The random priority rule selects a permutation of the voters uniformly at random, and then implements the priority rule for that permutation. It is anonymous, neutral, and satisfies the following additional properties:

 Ex-post PE, but not (ex-ante) PE.
 With the analogue of single-peaked preferences (candidates are ordered on a line and each voter approves an interval), random-priority is PE.
 Weak-group-SP.
 Group-FS.

A disadvantage of this rule is that it is computationally-hard to find the exact probabilities (see Dictatorship mechanism#Computation).

Conditional utilitarian rule 
In the conditional utilitarian rule, each agent receives 1/n of the total budget. Each agent finds, among the candidates that he approves, those that are supported by the largest number of other agents, and splits his budget equally among them. It is anonymous and neutral, and satisfies the following additional properties:

 Individual-SP;
 Group-FS;
 Ex-post PE but not (ex-ante) PE. 
It is more efficient than random-priority, both in theory and in simulations.
It always finds a distribution that is PE among the subset of group-FS distributions.

Majoritarian rule 
The majoritarian rule aims to concentrate as much power as possible in the hands of few candidates, while still guaranteeing fairness. It proceeds in rounds. Initially, all candidates and voters are active. In each round, the rule selects an active candidate c who is approved by the largest set of active voters, Nc. Then, the rule "assigns" these voters Nc to c, that is, it assumes that voters in Nc voted only for c, and assigns c the fraction |Nc|/n. Then, the candidate c and the voters in Nc become inactive, and the rule proceeds to the next round. Note that the conditional-utilitarian rule is similar, except that the voters in Nc  do not become inactive.

The majoritarian rule is anonymous, neutral, guarantees individual-FS and single-vote-FS.

Impossibility results 
Some combinations of properties cannot be attained simultaneously.

 Ex-post PE and group-SP are incompatible (for ≥3 voters and ≥3 candidates).
Anonymity, neutrality, ex-post PE and weakly-group-SP are incompatible (for ≥4 voters and ≥6 candidates).
If we remove one of these properties, then the remaining three can be attained.
Ex-post PE, individual-SP and individual-outcome-FS are incompatible (for ≥3 voters and ≥3 candidates).
If we remove one of these properties, then the remaining two can be attained.
However, if we weaken individual-outcome-FS by allowing to give each agent only ε times his fair-outcome-share, for some ε>0, the impossibility remains.
Anonymity, neutrality, PE, individual-SP and individual-FS are incompatible (for ≥5 voters and ≥17 candidates). 
If we remove either PE or individual-SP or individual-FS, then the remaining four properties can be attained. 
If we remove anonymity and neutrality, the impossibility still holds, but is much harder to prove.
In contrast, in the analogue of single-peaked preferences (candidates are ordered on a line and each voter approves an interval), all properties are attained by random-priority.
If we weaken individual-SP to excludable-SP, the properties are satisfied by the egalitarian rule.
It is open whether PE and excludable-SP are compatible with strict-participation and/or unanimous-FS.
PE, preference-monotonicity and positive-share (a property weaker than individual-FS) are incompatible (for ≥6 voters and ≥6 candidates).
Anonymity, neutrality, PE, individual-SP and group-FS are incompatible (for ≥5 voters and ≥4 candidates).
If we remove either PE or individual-SP or group-FS, then the remaining four properties can be attained. 
If we remove anonymity and neutrality, the impossibility still holds, but is much harder to prove.
When there are at most 4 voters or at most 3 candidates, a simple variant of random dictatorship attains all 5 properties: a dictator is selected at random, and the most popular outcome he likes is selected. This rule is anonymous, neutral, ex-post PE, individual-SP, Group-FS, and ex-post PE; but with at most 4 voters or at most 3 candidates, ex-post PE implies PE.
PE, individual-SP and positive-share are incompatible (for ≥6 voters and ≥4 candidates). This was proved with the help of a SAT Solver using 386 different profiles - probably the longest proof in social choice.
With anonymity and neutrality as additional properties, the incompatibility holds already for ≥5 voters and ≥4 candidates, and the proof is much simpler.

Summary table 
In the table below, the number in each cell represents the "strength" of the property: 0 means none (the property is not satisfied); 1 corresponds to the weak variant of the property; 2 corresponds to a stronger variant; etc.

See also 

 Justified representation - a property similar to fair-share, but for discrete outcomes.
Party-approval voting - the candidates are parties, and the fraction allocated to each party corresponds to the fraction of seats it should get in the parliament.
Participatory budgeting algorithms - other approaches for distributing a budget fairly.
Some authors studied the price of fairness of various distribution rules.
The distribution problem has been studied also in the more challenging setting in which agents have additive utilities.

References 

Social choice theory
Approval voting